Jeerachai Ladadok (is a professional footballer from Thailand. He is currently playing for Phitsanulok in Thai League 3 as a  left-winger.

Honours

Club
 Lamphun Warriors
 Thai League 2 (1): 2021–22

External links
 

1992 births
Living people
Jeerachai Ladadok
Association football forwards
Jeerachai Ladadok
Jeerachai Ladadok
Jeerachai Ladadok